Armandiella is a genus of gastropods belonging to the family Camaenidae.

Species:

Armandiella davidi 
Armandiella sarelii

References

Camaenidae
Gastropod genera